Marco António Burigo Balthazar (born 14 May 1983) is a Brazilian footballer who plays as an attacking midfielder for Esporte Clube Cruzeiro.

He also holds an Italian passport.

Career
Born in Porto Alegre, Rio Grande do Sul, Balthazar signed a 5-year contract with RS Futebol Clube in January 2002. He scored 12 goals in Campeonato Gaúcho Segunda Divisão in 2004, as team top-scorer. In September 2004 he was loaned to Swiss Super League club Servette.

After a short spell back to Brazil, he was signed by Lausanne in February 2006, along with Mauro. He was released by Lausanne at the end of the 2009 season.

In May 2010 he signed a 1-year contract with Caxias, rejoining former teammate Mauro and Marcos Rogério. He played twice in 2010 Campeonato Brasileiro Série C and also played at 2010 Copa FGF.

References

External links

 

Brazilian footballers
Servette FC players
FC Lausanne-Sport players
Esporte Clube Cruzeiro players
Sociedade Esportiva e Recreativa Caxias do Sul players
Swiss Super League players
Association football forwards
Brazilian expatriate footballers
Brazilian expatriate sportspeople in Switzerland
Expatriate footballers in Switzerland
Footballers from Porto Alegre
1983 births
Living people